Disparsine crustata is a species of moth of the family Erebidae, subfamily Arctiinae. It is found on Borneo, Peninsular Malaysia and Sumatra. The habitat consists of lowland forests, including heath forests.

Adults are sexually dimorphic. They are red with blackish fringes.

References

Nudariina
Moths of Borneo
Moths described in 1926